The 1953 Washington State Cougars football team was an American football team that represented Washington State College during the 1953 college football season. Led by second-year head coach Al Kircher, the team was 4–6 overall and 3–4 in the Pacific Coast Conference.

Two home games were played on campus in Pullman at Rogers Field, and one in Spokane in November. A road game was played nearby, against Palouse neighbor Idaho in Moscow, extending WSC's unbeaten streak over the Vandals to 27 games. The Cougars defeated rival Washington by five points in Seattle.

Schedule

NFL Draft
Four Cougars were selected in the 1954 NFL Draft, which was thirty rounds (360 selections).

References

External links
 Game program: USC at WSC – September 19, 1953
 Game program: Oregon at WSC – October 10, 1953
 Game program: TCU vs. WSC at Spokane – November 7, 1953

Washington State
Washington State Cougars football seasons
Washington State Cougars football